Yizhar may refer to:

People

Given name
Yizhar Ashdot (born 1958), Israeli musician
Yizhar Cohen (swimmer) (born 1962), Israeli paralympic swimmer
Yizhar Harari (1908–78), Israeli Zionist activist and politician
Yizhar Hess (born 1967), CEO of the Masorti Judaism movement in Israel
Yizhar Hirschfeld (1950–2006), Israeli archaeologist
Yizhar Shai (born 1963), Israeli businessman and politician
Yizhar Smilansky (1916–2006), better known by his pen name S. Yizhar, Israeli writer and politician

Surname
S. Yizhar, see Yishar Smilanksy above)

Other
Yitzhar, an Israeli settlement in the West Bank